Pauline Irene Batebe also Irene Pauline Batebe or Irene Batebe, is a Ugandan chemical and mechanical engineer, who serves as the Permanent Secretary in the Uganda Ministry of Energy and Mineral Development, since August 2021.

Before that, she was the chairperson of the Uganda Refinery Holding Company (URHC), a subsidiary company of the Uganda National Oil Company (UNOC). When the Uganda Oil Refinery is built, URHC will own the shareholding that the government of Uganda will acquire in the joint venture.

Irene Batebe, a board member of the UNOC, also served as the Principal Refining Engineer in the Uganda Ministry of Energy and Mineral Development, since February 2009. She is responsible for ensuring that the machinery and equipment imported into the country to build the Uganda Oil Refinery and Uganda–Tanzania Crude Oil Pipeline meet standards and specifications. Batebe is one of the most senior engineers in the Energy ministry. She often accompanies the president of Uganda and or the Minister of Energy on international trips concerning the proposed oil refinery and crude oil pipeline. She is the government technocrat whose primary responsibility is building the oil refinery, the crude oil pipelines and petroleum products pipeline.

Background and education
She was born in Uganda circa 1982. She attended Ugandan schools for her pre-university education. In 2001, she was admitted to the University of Dar es Salaam, graduating in 2005 with a Bachelor of Science degree in chemical and processing engineering. In 2007 she was admitted to the KTH Royal Institute of Technology, in Stockholm, Sweden, graduating in 2010 with a Master of Science degree in mechanical engineering, with focus on sustainable energy engineering. She then entered the University of Manchester in the United Kingdom, where in 2011, she was awarded the Master of Science degree in advanced chemical process design, with a focus on refinery design and operation.

Career
Batebe was hired in February 2009 as the chief refining engineer at the Uganda Ministry of Energy and Minerals. Her responsibilities at the ministry include the certification that all the equipment and machinery imported into Uganda to construct the refinery and the East African Crude Oil Pipeline meet international standards and is of the right quality and specification.

Family
Irene Batebe was married to the late Stephen Okello.

Other considerations
In August 2015, when the National Oil Company of Uganda was established, Pauline Irene Batebe was named to its seven-person board of directors, where she still serves as of November 2017. She is also one of a handful of Ugandan women involved in the country's nascent extractives industry. In January 2017, she was appointed Chairperson of the board of directors of the Uganda Refinery Holding Company Limited, the holding company of the proposed oil refinery in Kabaale, Buseruka sub-county, in Hoima District. This holding company is a 100 percent subsidiary of the state-owned Uganda National Oil Company.

See also
 Catherine Amusugut
 Proscovia Nabbanja
 Josephine Wapakabulo
 Uganda Oil Refinery

References

External links
Website of the Uganda Ministry of Energy and Minerals
Energy ministry staff cited in oil company top job saga

1982 births
Living people
Ugandan chemical engineers
Ugandan mechanical engineers
Ugandan women engineers
People from Eastern Region, Uganda
University of Dar es Salaam alumni
KTH Royal Institute of Technology alumni
Alumni of the University of Manchester
21st-century women engineers
21st-century Ugandan women scientists
21st-century Ugandan scientists